The 2022 Carlos Alcaraz tennis season officially began on 17 January 2022, with the start of the Australian Open in Melbourne. 

Winning 5 titles, he won his first Grand Slam at the 2022 US Open, defeating Casper Ruud in the final and becoming World number 1.

He clinched the world number 1 ranking for 16 weeks in 2022.

Yearly summary

Early hard court season

Australian Open

All matches

This table chronicles all the matches of Carlos Alcaraz in 2022.

Singles matches

Schedule
Per Carlos Alcaraz, this is his current 2022 schedule (subject to change).

Singles schedule

source：Rankings breakdown

Yearly records

Head-to-head matchups
Carlos Alcaraz has a  ATP match win–loss record in the 2022 season. Bold indicates player was ranked top 10 at the time of at least one meeting. The following list is ordered by number of wins:

  Marin Čilić 3–0
  Pablo Carreño Busta 2–0
  Karen Khachanov  2–0
  Mackenzie McDonald 2–0
  Jaume Munar 2–0
  Casper Ruud 2–0
  Kwon Soon-woo 2–0
  Stefanos Tsitsipas 2–0
  Facundo Bagnis  1–0
  Sebastián Báez  1–0
  Roberto Bautista Agut 1–0
  Nikoloz Basilashvili 1–0
  Jenson Brooksby  1–0
  Federico Coria 1–0
  Federico Delbonis 1–0
  Grigor Dimitrov 1–0
  Novak Djokovic 1–0
  Jack Draper 1–0
  Marius Copil 1–0
  Norbert Gombos 1–0
  Tallon Griekspoor 1–0
  Fabio Fognini 1–0
  Márton Fucsovics  1–0
  Hubert Hurkacz  1–0
  Miomir Kecmanović  1–0
  Filip Krajinović  1–0
  Nicola Kuhn  1–0
  Dušan Lajović 1–0
  Juan Ignacio Londero 1–0
  Alex de Minaur 1–0
  Gaël Monfils  1–0
  Alex Molčan  1–0
  Yoshihito Nishioka 1–0
  Oscar Otte  1–0
  Diego Schwartzman 1–0
  Jan-Lennard Struff 1–0
  Alejandro Tabilo 1–0
  Frances Tiafoe  1–0
  Albert Ramos Viñolas 1–0
  Botic van de Zandschulp 1–0
  Giulio Zeppieri 1–0
  Cameron Norrie  2–1
  Matteo Berrettini 1–1
  Sebastian Korda 1–1
  Rafael Nadal 1–1
  Alexander Zverev  1–1
  Jannik Sinner  1–2
  David Goffin 0–1
  Lorenzo Musetti  0–1
  Holger Rune 0–1
  Tommy Paul 0–1
  Félix Auger-Aliassime 0–2

* Statistics correct .

Top 10 wins

Finals

Singles: 7 (5 titles, 2 runner-ups)

Earnings

Bold font denotes tournament win

 Figures in United States dollars (USD) unless noted. 
source：2022 Singles Activity
source：2022 Doubles Activity

See also

 2022 ATP Tour
 2022 Rafael Nadal tennis season
 2022 Novak Djokovic tennis season
 2022 Daniil Medvedev tennis season

Notes

References

External links
 ATP tour profile

Carlos Alcaraz tennis seasons
Alcaraz
Alcaraz
2022 in Spanish sport